Zee Yuva is a second Marathi GEC by Zee Entertainment Enterprises which is first youth centric channel. It was launched on 22 August 2016. Due to the COVID-19 pandemic, all shows of channel were stopped on 27 March 2020 and again restarted from 13 July 2020. The channel is headquartered in Mumbai, Maharashtra.

Award functions

Reception

Former broadcast

Drama series 
 Freshers फ्रेशर्स
 Shravanbal Rockstar श्रावणबाळ रॉकस्टार
 Bun Maska बन मस्का
 Love Lagna Locha लव लग्न लोचा
 Ithech Taka Tambu इथेच टाका तंबू
 Shaurya: Gatha Abhimanachi शौर्य: गाथा अभिमानाची
 Prem He... प्रेम हे...
 Phulpakharu फुलपाखरू
 Anjali - Jhep Swapnanchi अंजली - झेप स्वप्नांची
 Girls Hostel गर्ल्स हॉस्टेल
 Jindagi Not Out जिंदगी नॉट आऊट
 Rudram रुद्रम
 Devashappath देवाशप्पथ
 Baapmanus बापमाणूस
 Gulmohar गुलमोहर
 Katti Batti कट्टी बट्टी
 Aamhi Doghi आम्ही दोघी
 Sur Rahu De सूर राहू दे
 Tu Ashi Jawali Raha तू अशी जवळी रहा
 Vartul वर्तुळ
 Ek Ghar Mantarlela एक घर मंतरलेलं
 Saajana साजणा
 Almost Sufal Sampoorna ऑलमोस्ट सुफळ संपूर्ण
 Prem Poison Panga प्रेम पॉयझन पंगा
 Doctor Don डॉक्टर डॉन
 Tuza Maza Jamtay तुझं माझं जमतंय

Reality shows 
 Dance Maharashtra Dance डान्स महाराष्ट्र डान्स
 Sangeet Samrat संगीत सम्राट (3 seasons)
 Laav Re To Video लाव रे तो व्हिडिओ (2 seasons)
 Yuvagiri युवागिरी
 English Binglish इंग्लिश बिंग्लिश
 Sparsh Vatsalyacha स्पर्श वात्सल्याचा
 Apsara Aali अप्सरा आली
 Yuva Singer Ek Number युवा सिंगर एक नंबर
 Mehfil मेहफिल
 Sargam सरगम
 Yuva Dancing Queen युवा डान्सिंग क्वीन
 Yuvotsav युवोत्सव
 Dancing Queen Unlock डान्सिंग क्वीन अनलॉक

References

External links 
 Zee Yuva at ZEE5

Marathi-language television channels
Zee Entertainment Enterprises